MV Tønsberg is a roll-on/roll-off ship owned by Wilh. Wilhelmsen.  it is the largest RORO ship in the world.

Specification
Gross tonnage is 76,500 gt. Capacity is 5% – 7% higher than Mark IV roro ships.
Decks: Six fixed decks and three hoistable ones (4B, 6 and 8, lifted by electric winches). The main deck can take loads 7.1|m high – more than other vessels – allowing very large loads. The total deck space is 50,335 m2 and cargo volume is 138,000 m³. Internal ramps are 8 metres wide; The weather deck (which can be used for outsize or unusual loads, such as wind turbine blades) also has a 4m wide ramp from below, to reduce the need for cranes. 
Design: Hull form has been improved, so compared to previous ships it will use 15 – 20% less fuel per unit of cargo. Stability has been improved, to reduce the need for ballast water. There is a double bottom and Deck 5 is also watertight.
Propulsion: 7-cylinder MAN B&W engine, which has been derated from 22,890 kW to 20,100 kW MCR at 108rpm; (although normal output in service is 18,090 kW), driving a  diameter 6-bladed propeller; plus two 2,500 kW Kawasaki thrusters (one each at the bow and the stern). Service speed is 20.25 knots.

History
MV Tønsberg is the fourth Wilhelmsen ship to carry this name; it's named after the Norwegian coastal town where Wilhelmsen was founded in 1861. It was built to celebrate the 150th anniversary of Wilh. Wilhelmsen line. It is the first in a series of four "Mark V" ships, built in 2010-2011 by Mitsubishi Heavy Industries shipyard in Nagasaki, in Japan. The second ship of the class, Parsifal, was delivered in September 2011.

In June 2012, Tønsberg was awarded "Ship of the Year 2011" by the Japan Society of Naval Architects and Ocean Engineers, recognising its efficiency and environmental compatibility.

References

External links
 Photos of MV Tønsberg

Ro-ro ships
2010 ships
Tønsberg
Ships of Malta
Wallenius Wilhelmsen Logistics